Alfred Oppenheim may refer to:

 Alfred Oppenheim (chemist) (1878–1943), German chemist and gas mantle manufacturer
 Alfred Oppenheim (artist) (1873–1953), German artist
 Alfred Freiherr von Oppenheim (1934–2005), known in America as Alfred Oppenheim, German billionaire and banker